The Royal House of Semou Njekeh Joof (Serer : Mbind Sem-Jike, Mbin Semou Njike or Mbind Semu Jike Juuf, other : Keur Semou Djiké) was founded in the early 18th century by Maad Semou Njekeh Joof from the Kingdom of Sine, now part of present-day Senegal. It was the third and last royal house founded by the Joof family – (the Joof dynasty of Sine and Saloum) during the Guelowar period, since the reignes of Maad a Sinig Maysa Wali Jaxateh Manneh and Maad a Sinig Mahecor Joof (1350 and 1969 respectively). From the date of its foundation up to the dissolution of Sine in 1969, at least seven kings from this royal house had succeeded to the throne of Sine.

List of kings
List of kings from the Royal House of Semou Njekeh Joof:

 Maad a Sinig Boukar Tjilas Sanghaie Joof, son of Maad Semou Njekeh Joof and the first from this royal house to rule in Sine. Reigned: c. 1724–1735.
 Maad a Sinig Boukar Tjilas a Mbotil Joof, reigned: c. 1735–1750.
Maad a Sinig Mbaye Fotlou Juk Joof, reigned : c. 1763 -1770.
 Maad a Sinig Ama Joof Gnilane Faye Joof, the most controversial king from this royal house. Reigned : c.. 1825 – 1853.
 Maad a Sinig Kumba Ndoffene Famak Joof, one of the most famous kings from this royal house. Reigned : 1853 – August 1871.
 Maad a Sinig Semou Mak Joof, physically abused in childhood by his guardian and uncle (Maad a Sinig Sanmoon Faye – king of Sine), he later launched a war against him, defeated him and usurped his throne. In November 1881, he committed suicide by shooting himself in the head with a revolver. Reigned: 1878–1882*.
 Maad a Sinig Amadi Baro Joof, he defeated Maad a Sinig Mbackeh Mak Njie at the Battle of Patar. While playing a board game with his servant at Ndiob, he was surprised by the men of Maad a Sinig Mbackeh Mak and killed. Reigned: 1882–1884.
 Maad a Sinig Mahecor Joof, the last king of Sine. He died in 1969 the same year the last king of Saloum (Maad Saloum Fode N'Gouye Joof) died. Reigned: 1924–1969

See also
The Royal House of Boureh Gnilane Joof
The Royal House of Jogo Siga Joof
Kingdom of Sine
Serer people
Joof family
Kingdom of Saloum
Kingdom of Baol
Joos Maternal Dynasty

Notes

Bibliography
 Sarr, Alioune. Histoire du Sine-Saloum (Sénégal). Introduction, bibliographie et notes par Charles Becker. Version légèrement remaniée par rapport à celle qui est parue en 1986–87.
 Diouf, Niokhobaye. Chronique du royaume du Sine. Suivie de notes sur les traditions orales et les sources écrites concernant le royaume du Sine par Charles Becker et Victor Martin. (1972). Bulletin de l'Ifan, Tome 34, Série B, n° 4, (1972).
 Klein, Martin. A. Islam and Imperialism in Senegal Sine-Saloum, 1847–1914. Edinburgh University Press (1968).
Buschinger, Danielle (ed & trans:  Kloos, Jan Willem), Van den vos Reynaerde: mittelniederländisch – neuhochdeutsch, Presses du Centre d'Etudes médiévales Université de Picardie (1992), p. 59, 

Serer royalty